Camelford is a town and civil parish in north Cornwall, England, United Kingdom, situated in the River Camel valley northwest of Bodmin Moor. The town is approximately ten miles (16 km) north of Bodmin and is governed by Camelford Town Council. Lanteglos-by-Camelford is the ecclesiastical parish in which the town is situated (not to be confused with Lanteglos-by-Fowey). The ward population at the 2011 Census was 4,001. The town population at the same census was 865.

Camelford is in the North Cornwall parliamentary constituency represented by Scott Mann MP since 2015. Until 1974, the town was the administrative headquarters of Camelford Rural District. From 2009 to 2021, the town was represented on Cornwall Council by the Camelford division. From the 2021 local elections, it will be represented by the Camelford and Boscastle division.

The two main industrial enterprises in the area are the slate quarry at Delabole and the cheese factory at Davidstow and there is a small industrial estate at Highfield.

The A39 road (dubbed 'Atlantic Highway') passes through the town centre: a bypass has been discussed for many years. Camelford Station, some distance from the town, closed in 1966; the site was subsequently used as a cycling museum.

Toponymy

The Cornish language name for the town, comes from a combination of the Middle Cornish "" (ford) + the River Camel's Cornish name  (crooked, skew-whiff). It is a modern formation.  

The English name of Camelford was formed by a Anglicisation of the river's name to Camel + Ford, giving it an identical meaning to its Cornish counterpart. The earliest records of the name are in 1205 and 1256 and it has the meaning "ford over the (river) Camel".

Due to the river's name sounding similar to the English word camel, the animal is seen as a symbol of the town. As such it can be seen on the town's coat of arms and the Sir James Smith's School logo, among other uses in the area.

Geography

Its position near the highest land in Cornwall makes the climate rather wet. On 8 June 1957,  of rain fell at Camelford. Roughtor is the nearest of the hills of Bodmin Moor to the town and numerous prehistoric remains can be found nearby as well. Camelford Town Hall was built in 1806, but is now used as a branch public library. By the riverside is Enfield Park; hamlets in the parish include Helstone, Tregoodwell, Valley Truckle, Hendra, Lanteglos, Slaughterbridge, Tramagenna, Treforda and Trevia. The economy depends largely on agriculture and tourism. There was a china clay works at Stannon.

Places of interest

Camelford is the home of the North Cornwall Museum and Gallery which contains paintings and objects of local historical interest. To the northwest at Slaughterbridge is an Arthurian Centre and at nearby Camelford Station is the Cycling Museum, which, according to Google, is now permanently closed. To the east are the hills of Roughtor and Brown Willy and to the south the old parish churches at Lanteglos and Advent.

Transport
The main road through Camelford is the A39 (Atlantic Highway) and there is a thrice-daily bus service from Newquay to Exeter via Launceston that serves the town. A tentatively-planned bypass is on hold; traffic problems continue to crowd the town especially during summer weekends.  From 1893 to 1966 the town had a station on the North Cornwall Railway. The nearest national railway station is Bodmin Parkway, 14 miles distant.

History

Early history
Camelford has been linked to the legendary Camelot and the battle of Camlann, but historians have refuted these suggestions.

Camelford has sometimes been linked to Gafulford the site of a battle against the West Saxons which is more likely to have been at Galford in Devon. Nearby Slaughterbridge has been supposed to be the site of a battle; an error arising because the derivation of "slaughter" in this case from an Anglo-Saxon word for "marsh" was not understood.

Manor of Helston in Trigg
Helstone (or Helston in Trigg) was in the Middle Ages one of the chief manors of the Hundred of Trigg and perhaps in Celtic times the seat of a chieftain. In the Domesday Book this manor was held by Earl Robert of Mortain: there were 2 hides, land for 15 ploughs; the lord had 4 ploughs & 18 serfs; 20 villagers & 18 smallholders had 8 ploughs;  of woodland; 6 square leagues of pasture; five kinds of livestock, in total 195 beasts. The manor of Penmayne was a dependency of this manor. It was one of the 17 Antiqua maneria of the Duchy of Cornwall.

Modern history

The town elected two members to the Unreformed House of Commons: the first MPs sat in the Parliament of 1552. It was later considered a rotten borough, and in 1832 the Camelford parliamentary constituency was abolished and the town became part of the East Cornwall constituency.

The seal of the borough shows: Arg. a camel passing through a ford of water all proper with legend "Sigillum Vill: de Camelford".

Reskammel / Camelford was the venue for Gorsedh Kernow in 2012.

Water pollution incident

In July 1988, the water supply to the town and the surrounding area was contaminated when 20 tons of aluminium sulphate was accidentally poured into the wrong tank at the Lowermoor Water Treatment Works on Bodmin Moor. An independent inquiry into the incident, the worst of its kind in British history, started in 2002, and a draft report was issued in January 2005, but questions remain as to the long-term effects on the health of residents. Michael Meacher, who visited Camelford as environment minister, called the incident and its aftermath, "A most unbelievable scandal."

Churches and schools

The parish church of Camelford is at Lanteglos by Camelford though there is also a Church of St Thomas of Canterbury (opened in 1938) in the town. Lanteglos church is dedicated to St Julitta. (At Jetwells near Camelford is a holy well; Jetwells derives from "Julitta's well".) Arthur Langdon (1896) recorded the existence of seven stone crosses in the parish, including three at the rectory (Lanteglos Rectory was converted into a guesthouse in the mid-20th century). There was in medieval times a chapel of St Thomas which probably fell into disuse after the Reformation (it is recorded in 1312). The Rector of Lanteglos is also responsible for the adjacent parish of Advent.

In Market Place is the Methodist Church (originally a Wesleyan Methodist Chapel). The founder of Methodism, John Wesley, visited Camelford on several occasions during his journeys in Cornwall. In the 1830s and 1840s the Camelford Wesleyan Methodist circuit underwent a secession by more than half the members to the Wesleyan Methodist Association. There is an older Methodist chapel (now disused) in Chapel Street.

Soul's Harbour Pentecostal Church is situated on the Clease adjacent to the car park. It is affiliated with The Assemblies of God of Great Britain and was founded in 1987. The building the Church occupies was built as the Church School in 1846.

Sir James Smith's School provides secondary education to the town and surrounding area and there is also a primary school.

Notable people associated with Camelford
The naval officer Samuel Wallis was born near Camelford (among his achievements was the circumnavigation of the world). Francis Hurdon, the Canadian politician was also born at Camelford. Two members of the Pitt family held the title of Baron Camelford: Thomas Pitt, 1st Baron Camelford (1737–1793) and Thomas Pitt, 2nd Baron Camelford (1775–1804). Samuel Pollard, missionary to China was also born in Camelford. Jason Dawe, former presenter of Top Gear, is from the town.

See also
Camelford RFC, rugby union club

References

Further reading

 Maclean, John (1872–79) The Parochial and Family History of the Deanery of Trigg Minor. 3 vols. London: Nichols & Son

External links

More on Camelford

Camelford Town Council
Government Inquiry Report, 2005
Cornwall Record Office Online Catalogue for Camelford

 
Towns in Cornwall
Civil parishes in Cornwall
Bodmin Moor